The University of Milan, known colloquially as UniMi or La Statale, is a public research university in Milan, Italy. It is one of the largest universities in Europe, with about 60,000 students, and a permanent teaching and research staff of about 2,000.

The University of Milan has ten schools and offers 140 undergraduate and graduate degree programmes, 32 Doctoral Schools and 65+ Specialization Schools. The University's research and teaching activities have grown over the years and have received important international recognitions.

The University is the only Italian member of the League of European Research Universities (LERU), a group of twenty-one research-intensive European Universities. It consistently ranks as first university in Italy (ARWU) sharing the place with University of Pisa and Sapienza University of Rome, and is also one of the best universities of Italy, both overall and in specific subject areas in other ranking systems.

The university has been frequented by many notable alumni, including one Nobel laureate in physics, Riccardo Giacconi, one Fields medalist, Enrico Bombieri, as well as the former Prime Ministers Silvio Berlusconi and Bettino Craxi. The university has also been affiliated with notable faculty such as the Nobel Laureate in chemistry Giulio Natta, and the Wolf Prize in Physics Giuseppe Occhialini.

Academics

The University of Milan is a public teaching and research university, the second largest university in Italy, which – with nine schools and a teaching staff of about 2,200 – comprises a wide variety of disciplinary fields.

Schools

The University comprises 10 Schools (facoltà):
 School of Law
 School of Medicine
 School of Humanities
 School of Veterinary Medicine
 School of Agricultural and Food Sciences
 School of Pharmaceutical Sciences 
 School of Science and Technology
 School of Exercise and Sport Sciences
 School of Political, Economic and Social Sciences
 School of Linguistics and Cultural Mediation

Admissions 
Degree programmes at the University of Milan are divided into:

 open-admission programmes: Each degree programme defines the knowledge and requirements for matriculation; these may be verified through a compulsory test and/or through an interview for assessing the student's educational background, prior to matriculation. 
 capped-enrolment programmes: To enrol, students must register for an entrance examination, pass it and rank high enough to be awarded one of the places available.

To enroll at the University of Milan is required an English language assessment, which can be demonstrated by an international language certificate (CEFR), or through the university language centre (SLAM). The required level for Bachelors usually stands at B2 (Intermadiate), while for Masters is C1. Those who will not have attained the language level required by their degree programme via Placement test or certification must attend an English language course, and pass the final exam. With the University of Milano-Bicocca, and the Alma Mater of Bologna, is the most sought-after location for medical students, with an acceptance rate of about 5%.

Graduation 
Full-time students are expected to earn 60 credits (CFU) in one academic year. The credits awarded can be recognized for continuing studies, both in Italian universities and abroad. To be awarded a bachelor, the student must earn at least 180 CFU, while to get a master 120 CFU are needed. Also, to obtain the highest level of university education, the Dottorato di Ricerca (Ph.D.), at least other 3 to 4 years of studies are required.

Financial Support 
The University of Milan provides several types of financial support for students:

 Education incentive Programme: Regional scholarships consisting of a sum of money and free access to refectory services, awarded yearly, via competition, to university students meeting certain merit, income and regular attendance requirements. Additional DSU allowances and grants includes Disability, International mobility, and Special grant allowances.
 International scholarships: "Excellence Scholarships" for students enrolled in the first year of a master's degree programme, providing €6.000 grant, full tuition and accommodation paid.

The university also provides Accommodation, Refectory services and meals allowances for a large number of students.

Research
There are 53 research centres. Research is organised in 33 different departments:

Law: Private Law and Legal History,  Italian and Supranational Public Law, Law.
 Medicine: Medical Biotechnology and Translational Medicine, Pathophysiology and Transplantation, Oncology and Hematology-Oncology, Biomedical Sciences for Health,  Biomedical and Clinical Sciences, Biomedical, Surgical and Dental Sciences, Clinical Sciences and Community Health, Health Sciences.
 Humanities: Cultural and Environmental Heritage, Philosophy, Foreign Languages and Literatures, Literary Studies, Philology and Linguistics, Historical Studies.
 Veterinary Medicine: Veterinary Medicine, Veterinary Science for Health, Animal Production and Food Safety.
 Agricultural and Food Sciences: Agricultural and Environmental Sciences - Production, Landscape, Agroenergy, Food, Environmental and Nutritional Sciences, Environmental Science and Policy
 Pharmaceutical Sciences: Pharmacological and Biomolecular Sciences, Pharmaceutical Sciences. 
 Science and Technology: Biosciences, Chemistry, Physics, Computer Science, Mathematics, Earth Sciences, Environmental Science and Policy.
 Exercise and Sport Sciences: Biomedical Sciences for Health.
 Political, Economic and Social Sciences: Economics, Management and Quantitative Methods, Social and Political Sciences, International, Legal, Historical and Political Studies.
 Linguistics and Cultural Mediation: Language Mediation and Intercultural Communication.

The University of Milan is a leading Italian university for investment in research infrastructure and human capital: two essential elements for tackling the complex challenges of knowledge in a rapidly changing social and industrial context.

As a public institution concerned with the development and progress of knowledge, the University has always been committed to research projects that influence the quality of life of citizens. Research is mostly conducted in the departments and the many specialised structures, favouring the creation and growth of networks of collaboration locally, nationally and internationally.

Scientific activity involves the whole academic community from professors, researchers, doctoral students, fellowship-holders and fellows to undergraduates.

Quality and impact of research (2020) 

 Publications in 2020:  9536
 Open access publications in 2020: 5074
 Top 10% area publications (SciVal): 33,9%
 Field Weighted-Citation Impact (SciVal): 1,78
 Unimi publications/national publications (SciVal): 5,55%
 ERC grants since the beginning of the project: 37

Governance 
The governance structure at the University of Milan is composed by 17 committees, headed by the Rector. The most important boards are:

The Board of Directors 
It has the function of strategy definition and management, approval of the annual and three-year financial and personnel planning documents, and supervision of economic and financial sustainability. It is composed of the Rector, the Vice Rector, the General Director, and selected internal and external members.

The Academic senate 

The Academic Senate has functions of proposal, supervision and verification in the field of teaching, research and student services, and is composed of Rector, Vice Rector, the 10 faculty directors, and elected representative of professors, researchers and students.

Patent Committee 
Its statutory duties are to review patent applications, express an opinion on patents filed whenever a decision is required, and also express an opinion on industrial property clauses in commissioned research and patent enhancement contracts, and in research agreements with other institutions. It's composed by the General Director, three selected professors, and two external experts.

University Sports Committee 
The University Sports Committee promotes and encourages sports activities for the entire University community and oversees management guidelines for sports facilities and development programmes. The chairman of this board is the Deputy Rector. Every year the Committee presents a report on the University sports facilities, next year's programmeand financial plan to the Ministry of Education, University and Research.

Research Observatory 
It is composed of scientific experts belonging to various scientific disciplinary sectors as well as administrative and technical sectors. Its members are renewed every three academic years. The Observatory, as per the Regulations collects and analyzes information on University research findings; as part of this function, it analyzes and compares the results of national research assessment exercises. It also proposes criteria and new methodologies for assessing University research findings, taking into account the specificities of each area and submits improvement actions to the main governing bodies, with a view to increasing research quality, attractiveness, national and international visibility

Campuses

The University of Milan possesses an important artistic and cultural heritage that includes important historic buildings, inherited and acquired collections, archives, botanical gardens and the old Brera Astronomical Observatory commissioned by Maria Theresa of Austria. The University's departments are housed in important historic buildings in the centre of Milan and in modern buildings in the area known as Città Studi (City of Studies).
Among the palazzos that house the University's facilities are the old "Ca’ Granda" ("the big house"), a monumental complex from the 15th century in the heart of the historical city centre; the 18th-century Palazzo Greppi designed by Giuseppe Piermarini (architect of La Scala in Milan) and the 17th-century Sant’Alessandro College commissioned by the Arcimboldi family. The book collection, which is one of the richest in the region, is preserved in 47 libraries, while the APICE Centre collects rare and valuable book stocks and archives.

Headquarter - City Centre Campus 
The old "Ca’ Granda" ("the big house"), and other several historical buildings that surrounds the centre of Milan, close to the Cathedral, is a complex from the 15th century, by Filarete, that has been renewed in the last decade. It was one of the first Renaissance buildings in Milan and had a large following throughout northern Italy. Nowadays it is the seat of the University of Milan, where are located a large part of the humanistic studies, as well as law, and the main offices.

Città Studi - Scientific Campus 
Since the late 60s the exponential growth of the number of enrolled students forced the university to build other structures in the Città Studi neighbourhood. Here are located the main building of all the scientific schools and departments, as well as the majority of the research facilities. In the quarter is all located the 'Politecnico', the Technical University of Milan.

Città Studi Campus Sostenibile (CSCS, Città Studi Sustainable Campus) is a joint project launched by the University of Milan and the Milan Polytechnic in 2011 to turn the Città Studi (the historic university quarter in the city, home to the city's two main university campuses) into a forum on issues of sustainable development, thereby creating a model for the city at large to follow.

Devised as six roundtables on areas of intervention – People, Energy, Education, Mobility, City and Food and Health – the project aims to implement a series of best practices with the goal of improving the quality of life for those living in the university quarter, through projects, events, and programmes.

Milan Innovation District - MIND 
Australia-based Lendlease has been contracted to design, build and manage the MIND campus of the University of Milan by a resolution of the board of directors. The project for the new campus for Milan University science faculties in the Milan Innovation District (MIND), in the former Expo 2015 area, covers a total area of over 190,000 square meters. The new area will be shared with Human Technopole, Italy's new research institute for life sciences, and the new IRCSS Galeazzi Orthopedic Institute for medicine. The project has a total value of approximately 338 million €.

Hospital campuses 
The Faculty of Medicine and Surgery has teaching sectors at the following hospitals in Lombary:

 IRCSS Ca 'Granda Foundation Maggiore Policlinico Hospital
 "San Paolo" Hospital
 "Luigi Sacco" Hospital
 IRCSS San Donato Polyclinic
 "San Giuseppe" Hospital
 Gaetano Pini Orthopedic Institute
 IRCSS Monzino Cardiology Center
 IRCCS National Cancer Institute Foundation
 IRCSS Galeazzi Orthopedic Institute
 IFOM-IEO Campus
 "San Carlo Borromeo" Hospital
 Niguarda Ca 'Granda Hospital
 "Fatebenefratelli" Hospital

Outside Milan 
The Faculty of Veterinary Medicine, and The University of Milan Centre for Clinical Veterinary Medicine and Experimental Zootechny are located outside the city area, in Lodi. The Department of Studies in Language Mediation and Intercultural Communication is instead located in Sesto San Giovanni.

Rankings 

The University of Milan is the only Italian member of the League of European Research Universities (LERU), a group of twenty-one research-intensive European Universities, which it helped found.

It is ranked first in Italy (three-way tie) by the Academic Ranking of World Universities (ARWU), sharing the place with University of Pisa and Sapienza University of Rome.

The university consistently ranks as Italy's best university in a number of areas. In the most recent ranking of Italian universities released by ANVUR in February 2022, Statale ranked first among Italian universities in the areas of political science, sociology, law, and philosophy. It also ranked among the top three in economics and statistics, earth science, history, and antiquities.

The university is ranked third in Italy by Center for World University Rankings (CWUR) and fourth in the Webometrics Ranking of World Universities. while the Times Higher Education World University Rankings ranks it sixth to ninth (tied with four other universities).

Publishing 
Since before 2009, the University of Milan has published journals in Open access, of which about ten have already been included in the Directory of Open access journal . The fields of scientific interest are different: for linguistics and philology, for example, Italian LinguaDue and Carte Romance.

History

Early years
The University of Milan was founded in 1924 from the merger of two institutions that boasted a great tradition of medical, scientific and humanistic studies: the Accademia Scientifico-Letteraria (Scientific-Literary Academy), active since 1861, and the Istituti Clinici di Perfezionamento (Clinical Specialisation Institutes), established in 1906. By 1928, the University already had the fourth-highest number of enrolled students in Italy, after the University of Naples, Sapienza University of Rome and the University of Padua. Its premises are located in Città Studi (the City of Studies), the university district built from 1915 onwards (that is also home to the Politecnico di Milano), where scientific schools arehoused, and in several buildings in the city's historic  centre, which house the humanities schools.

At the time of its foundation, there were four "traditional" schools – Law, Humanities, Medicine and Mathematical, Physical and Natural Sciences; then, in the 1930s, the Schools of Veterinary Medicine and Agriculture were introduced, after the aggregation of the old schools of Veterinary Medicine (1792) and Agriculture (1871).

At the end of the Second World War, the old Ospedale dei Poveri (Hospital for the Poor) building, known as "la Cà Granda" (the Big House), was assigned to the University. This building, one of the first Italian examples of civil architecture – commissioned in the 15th century by the Sforza family, dukes of Milan – had been seriously damaged by the bombings of 1943. In 1958, after a complex series of reconstruction and renovation works, it became home to the University Rector's Office, the administrative offices and the schools of Law and Humanities.

1960s reformation
In the 1960s, due to the extension of compulsory school attendance and the subsequent liberalisation of access to higher education, the number of people entering Italian universities progressively increased and the University of Milan enrolled more than 60,000 students. The University added to its range of courses and at the same time increased its number of centres. Two new schools were established, Pharmacy and Social and Political Sciences, which were based, respectively, in Città Studi and in Via Conservatorio, in Milan city centre.

Città Studi was also the site of a new complex, intended entirely for the biology departments, which was the work of architect Vico Magistretti.
There was also an increase in the number of agreements with the city's hospital facilities, where students from the School of Medicine receive their clinical training.
In 1989 there were 22 degree courses and 75,000 enrolled students, which increased to 90,000 by 1993.

1980s streamline process
In view of this increase, the University began a process of streamlining and delocalising its facilities: from 1986 onwards, new centres began to appear in other areas of Milan, particularly in the Bicocca district, as well as in other parts of the region: in Como, Varese, Crema and Lodi.

In 1998, the University split in two and the city's second public institution was founded: The University of Milan-Bicocca. The University of Insubria was also established in Varese, bringing together courses that were already offered at Varese and Como by the Universities of Milan and Pavia.
At the conclusion of this process, notwithstanding the reduction in the number of students, the University of Milan was still the largest institution in Lombardy and still one of the largest in the country.

The 2001 law that transformed the education system opened a new phase of change. 
The University updated its range of courses, trying to adapt them to better suit the evolution of the social demand for education and the innovation of the production system: thus, the number of degree courses rose to 74 and there was a new increase in enrolments.

The most recent phase of expansion concerned the fields of communication science, intercultural mediation and art, but there are also ongoing projects relating to the sectors of information technology, veterinary medicine and biomedicine.
Furthermore, there was also a strengthening of commitment to technology transfer and the practical application of scientific research results in the economic-production context.

Present
At the present time, the University comprises 9 schools, 134 study courses (both undergraduate and graduate), 19 doctoral schools (scuole di dottorato) and 92 specialisation schools (scuole di specializzazione).
Approximately 65,000 students are enrolled at the University. The teaching staff is composed of 2,500 tenured professors and researchers and approximately 500 adjunct professors. More than 2,300 people work in the technical and administrative sector.
The University of Milan was one of the institutions that helped to found LERU, the League of European Research Universities, and is the only Italian University to be a member of the organisation. Thanks to its commitment to basic and applied research, the University is among the top institutions in the main national and international rankings.

Budget
In 2010, income – excluding special accounting and clearing entries – amounted to €562 million, primarily from:
State: €331 million for normal running costs
Students: €91 million in the form of fees and contributions
Public and private institutions: €59 million for research activities

Sports, arts and entertainment

Sporting activities
Centro Universitario Sportivo (CUS), University Sports Centre, is an amateur sports association which, for the last 60 years, has promoted the practice of physical education and sport by students and university collaborators.
Every year, the centre organises a vast range of sports courses, which cover everything from traditional disciplines, such as swimming and athletics, to more modern activities, such as hydro-biking, yoga and capoeira.

Arts and entertainment
University of Milan students can take part in music and theatre initiatives organised by the University's resident cultural institutions, which include the Orchestra, the Choir and the CUT, the University Theatre Centre.
The University of Milan Orchestra offers students the possibility to audition for a classical music ensemble in collaboration with the "Giuseppe Verdi" Conservatory of Milan and with the direction of Maestro Alessandro Crudele.

The University Choir is composed of university staff, students, professors and enthusiasts from outside the university. It is possible to become a member by passing an audition.

The Centro Universitario Teatrale (CUT), University Theatre Centre, is currently directed by Professor Alberto Bentoglio and collaborates actively with groups of university students who have been involved in theatre productions for several years.

Concessions for cultural activities
The University works closely with cinema, theatre, dance and music agents, to provide their students and collaborators with access to cultural initiatives and services at reduced prices.

Notable alumni

In science 
Notable alumni in science of the University of Milan include also Giovanni Bignami, astrophysicist (Bruno Rossi Prize 1993); Patrizia Caraveo, astrophysicist (Bruno Rossi Prize 2007, 2011 e 2012); Elena Cattaneo, biologist (gold medal from the Republic President, Senator for life); Alberto Mantovani, immunologist;

In politics and government 
Notable alumni in politics and government of the University of Milan include also Letizia Moratti (Minister of Education, University and Research); Elena Bonetti (Minister for Family and Equal Opportunities); Massimo Garavaglia (Minister of Tourism); Roberto Maroni (Minister of the Interior; Labour, Deputy Prime Minister); Maria Cristina Messa (Minister of University and Research, Rector of University of Milan-bicocca); Matteo Salvini (deputy prime minister, Minister of the Interior)

Entrepreneurs and managers 
Notable alumni in management end entrepreneurship of the University of Milan include also Bernardo Caprotti (Esselunga's Founder and CEO); Massimo Antonio Doris (Mediolanum Bank CEO); Carlo Ponti (producer); Fedele Confalonieri (Mediaset CEO).

Others 
Other notable alumni  of the University of Milan include also Enrico Mentana (Italian journalist, television presenter and publisher); Nino Rota (composer); Claudio Bisio (actor, presenter); Elisabetta Canalis (model); Antonella Clerici (presenter, host-TV); Sergio Romano (writer, journalist, and historian); Dario Edoardo Viganò (writer, priest).

Notable faculty

List of rectors

See also 

 List of early modern universities in Europe
 List of universities in Italy
 Nicolò Cesa-Bianchi
 Giuseppe Scaraffia
 University of Milano-Bicocca
 Milan school of physics
 Ospedale Niguarda Ca' Granda
 International Medical School, University of Milan
 Polytechnic University of Milan
 Bocconi University

References

External links 
University of Milan Website 
Università degli Studi di Milano 

 
Universities and colleges in Lombardy
Educational institutions established in 1924
1924 establishments in Italy